Sémelay is a commune in the Nièvre department in central France. The town of Sémelay belongs to the canton of Luzy and the arrondissement of Château-Chinon (Ville).

Geography
The river Alène flows westward through the southern part of commune.

The town's area is 33.53 km². It is situated at an altitude of about 294 meters.

Demographics
On 1 January 2019, the estimated population was 221.

See also
Communes of the Nièvre department

References

Communes of Nièvre